The Yardbirds Greatest Hits is the first compilation album of songs recorded by the Yardbirds. It was released in the United States in March 1967 by Epic Records and included all six of the Yardbirds' American A-side singles up to that time, plus three B-sides and the live "Smokestack Lightning" from Having a Rave Up and Five Live Yardbirds.

The album was the group's highest charting LP record in the US, peaking at number 28 on the Billboard 200 album chart. Despite the modest peak, it ranked number 73 on the magazine's year-end "Top LP's – 1967" chart because of its longevity.

Critical reception

AllMusic critic Bruce Eder gave the album four and a half out of five stars, who comments "the whole platter summed up, just about as neatly as it was possible to do across just ten songs, what made the Yardbirds a great band."  He notes that since the focus is on "hits", most of the selections feature guitarist Jeff Beck, although Eric Clapton and Jimmy Page are represented with one song each.  Eder adds:

Track listing

References

The Yardbirds compilation albums
1967 greatest hits albums
Albums produced by Giorgio Gomelsky
Epic Records compilation albums